Emperor Peak is a  mountain summit located in the Purcell Mountains of British Columbia, Canada. The nearest higher peak is Archduke Mountain,  to the east. These two peaks make up the double summit of the Archduke-Emperor massif. The mountain's name was officially adopted June 20, 1972, when approved by the Geographical Names Board of Canada. The peak was named for its regal appearance, and for Beethoven's Emperor Concerto, as submitted by climber Curt Wagner who had climbed the mountain in 1967.


Climate

Based on the Köppen climate classification, Emperor Peak is located in a subarctic climate zone with cold, snowy winters, and mild summers. Temperatures can drop below −20 °C with wind chill factors  below −30 °C. Precipitation runoff from Emperor Peak and meltwater from its glacier drains into tributaries of the Duncan River.

See also

Geography of British Columbia

References

External links
 Weather: Emperor Peak

Three-thousanders of British Columbia
Purcell Mountains
Kootenay Land District